The 2019–20 Michigan Tech Huskies men's basketball team will represent Michigan Tech in the 2019–20 NCAA Division II men's basketball season. The Huskies will be led by 26th-year head coach Kevin Luke and will play their home games at Sherman Stadium in Houghton, Michigan as members of the Great Lakes Intercollegiate Athletic Conference.

Offseason

Departures
Four players for the Michigan Tech that were on the 2018-19 roster for the Huskies weren't on the 2019-20 roster, including KC Borseth, Sean Clarey, Bryan Heath, and Dylon Williams.

Roster
To be updated during June 2021

Schedule and Results
Description of schedule and whereabouts of schedule coming soon

|-
!colspan=9 style=|GLIAC regular season

|-
!colspan=9 style=|GLIAC tournament

|-
!colspan=9 style=|NCAA DII Men's Tournament 2019

|-

Rankings
The Huskies' ranks are taken from the D2SIDA Poll, and the Coaches Poll from NABC Coaches

References 

Michigan Tech Huskies men's basketball seasons
Michigan Tech
Michigan Tech